2022 Academy Awards may refer to:

 94th Academy Awards, the Academy Awards ceremony that took place in 2022, honoring the best in film for March 2021 through December 2021
 95th Academy Awards, the Academy Awards ceremony that took place in 2023, honoring the best in film for 2022